The Broad River is a principal tributary of the Congaree River, about 150 miles (240 km) long, in western North Carolina and northern South Carolina in the United States.  Via the Congaree, it is part of the watershed of the Santee River, which flows to the Atlantic Ocean.

Course
The Broad River originates in the Blue Ridge Mountains of eastern Buncombe County, North Carolina and flows generally south-southeastwardly, through or along the boundaries of Rutherford, Polk and Cleveland Counties in North Carolina; and Cherokee, York, Union, Chester, Fairfield, Newberry and Richland Counties in South Carolina.  In North Carolina, the river is dammed to form Lake Lure; in South Carolina it passes through the Sumter National Forest and the communities of Cherokee Falls and Lockhart before joining the Saluda River to form the Congaree River in the city of Columbia.

Principal tributaries of the Broad River include the Green, Second Broad and First Broad Rivers in North Carolina ; and the Bowens, Pacolet, Sandy, Tyger, Enoree and Little Rivers in South Carolina.

Dams
This is an incomplete list of dams starting at Lake Lure and moving downstream

North Carolina
Lake Lure
Cliffside Steam Station (Duke Energy) on the Border of Rutherford and Cleveland Counties.
South Carolina
Gaston Shoals Dam (Gaffney)
Cherokee Falls
Ninety Nine Islands Dam adjacent to the abandoned Cherokee Nuclear Power Plant
Dam and canal at Lockhart
Neal Shoals Dam
Parr Shoals Dam forming Parr Reservoir
Columbia Canal and Dam in Columbia

Crossings
The Broad River is crossed several times by many highways (Note: this list at times may be incomplete)

North Carolina
Rutherford County

Grays Road
Union Road

Poors Ford Road
Big Island Road
Jack McKinney Road

Cleveland County

South Carolina
Gaffney/Cherokee County

Chester and Union Counties
 in Lockhart
 in Carlisle
Fairfield and Newberry Counties

 in Peak
Columbia

Variant names
According to the Geographic Names Information System, the Broad River has also been known as
Eswa Huppeday
Eswawpuddenah
Line River
Main Broad River
Eswan Happedaw

It was also known in colonial times as the English Broad River to distinguish it from the French Broad River which also originates in western North Carolina, but flows northwest.

The present name is descriptive of the river's width.

See also
French Broad River
List of North Carolina rivers
List of South Carolina rivers

References

 
Rivers of North Carolina
Rivers of South Carolina
Geography of Columbia, South Carolina